A geological survey is the systematic investigation of the geology beneath a given piece of ground for the purpose of creating a geological map or model. Geological surveying employs techniques from the traditional walk-over survey, studying outcrops and landforms, to intrusive methods, such as hand augering and machine-driven boreholes, to the use of geophysical techniques and remote sensing methods, such as aerial photography and satellite imagery.  Such surveys may be undertaken by state, province, or national geological survey organizations to maintain the geological inventory and advance the knowledge of geosciences for the benefit of the nation.
A geological survey map typically superimposes the surveyed extent and boundaries of geological units on a topographic map, together with information at points (such as measurements of orientation of bedding planes) and lines (such as the intersection of faults with the land surface). The maps and reports created by geological survey organisations generally aim for geographic continuity and completeness in establishing the spatial patterns of near-surface rock units. The map may include cross sections to illustrate the three-dimensional interpretation. Subsurface geological and geophysical maps, providing limited coverage of deeper geology (known, for example, from drilling for oil or gas), are maintained internally by major oil companies and regulators. Some geological survey organisations have collaborated with them to include subsurface geology in their systematic surveys, for example, the Geological Atlas of the Western Canada Sedimentary Basin. Subsurface maps typically depict the three-dimensional form of geological surfaces by means of contours and cross sections. Computer-based models are increasingly used to provide more comprehensive information storage and greater flexibility of presentation.
In the United States, the 50 state surveys are coordinated by the Association of American State Geologists.

Some examples of national geological surveys are: 

 British Geological Survey (BGS)
 Bureau de Recherches Géologiques et Minières (BRGM)
 Central Geological Survey (Taiwan)
 China Geological Survey
 Federal Institute for Geosciences and Natural Resources (BGR, Germany)
 Geological and Mining Institute of Spain
 Geological Survey of Austria
 Geological Survey of Canada
 Geological Survey of Denmark and Greenland
 Geological Survey of Finland
 Geological Survey of India
 Geological Survey of Ireland
 Geological Survey of Norway
 Geological Survey of Pakistan
 Geological Survey of Slovenia
 Geological Survey of Sweden
 Geoscience Australia 
 Saudi Geological Survey
 Swisstopo (Switzerland)
 United States Geological Survey (USGS)

Individual states or provinces may also have a geological survey.  Examples include:

 Alberta Geological Survey (Canada)
 California Geological Survey (USA)
 Delaware Geological Survey (USA)
 Geological Survey of Newfoundland and Labrador (Canada)
 Geological Survey of Queensland (Australia)
 Pennsylvania Geological Survey (USA)
 Utah Geological Survey (USA)

See also 
 Survey
 Prospecting
 OneGeology
 Systems geology
 Primary divisions of Surveying
 Mine survey

External links 
 International list of country geological surveys

 
Geological techniques